Newcastle Shot Tower, also known as Newcastle railway station, served the city of Newcastle-upon-Tyne, Tyne and Wear, England from 1839 to 1847 on the Newcastle & Carlisle Railway.

History 
The station opened on 21 October 1839 by the Newcastle & Carlisle Railway. It was situated on Railway Street, near the junction at Tyneside Road. The first passenger train at this temporary terminus was on 21 May 1839, which was for a special trip and regular passenger services began exactly five months later. A landslide occurred a few days after the station opened but it reopened on 2 November 1839. It closed on the same day as the second Newcastle station was opened on 1 March 1847.

References

External links 

Disused railway stations in Tyne and Wear
Railway stations in Great Britain opened in 1839
Railway stations in Great Britain closed in 1847
1839 establishments in England
1847 disestablishments in England